Claude-Marie-Louis-Emmanuel Carbon de Flins Des Oliviers (1757, Reims – July 1806, Vervins) was an 18th-century French man of letters and playwright.

Publications 
Theatre
1790: Le Réveil d'Épiménide à Paris, one-act comedy in verse, Paris, Théâtre de la Nation, 1 January Text online
1791: Le Mari directeur, ou le Déménagement du couvent, one-act comedy, in free verse, Paris, Théâtre de la Nation, 25 February, Text online
1791: La Jeune hôtesse, three-act comedy in verse, imitated from Goldoni, Paris, Théâtre de la République, 24 December, Text online
Varia
1779: Voltaire, poem, Text online: 1st edition 2nd edition revue et corrigée
1789: Les Voyages de l'opinion dans les quatre parties du monde
179?: Dialogue entre l'auteur et un frondeur, sur les ennemis des lettres & les faiseurs de libelles anonymes, suivi d'un Préservatif, Text online
1810: Choix de poésies by Nicolas Thomas Barthe and Carbon de Flins

Sources 
 Pierre Larousse, Grand Dictionnaire universel du XIXe, vol. VIII, 1872, (p. 485).

External links 
 Claude-Marie-Louis-Emmanuel Carbon de Flins Des Oliviers on CÉSAR
 Claude-Marie-Louis-Emmanuel Carbon de Flins Des Oliviers on Data.bnf.fr

18th-century French writers
18th-century French male writers
18th-century French dramatists and playwrights
Writers from Reims
1757 births
1806 deaths